Sukidion is a monotypic butterfly genus in the family Lycaenidae erected by Hamilton Herbert Druce in 1891. Its only species, Sukidion inores, was first described by William Chapman Hewitson in 1872. It is endemic to Borneo.

References

Iolaini
Butterflies of Borneo
Monotypic butterfly genera
Taxa named by Hamilton Herbert Druce
Lycaenidae genera